Wharton Regional Airport  is a public airport located five miles (8 km) southwest of the central business district of Wharton, a city in Wharton County, Texas, United States. It is owned by the City of Wharton.

Note that ARM was assigned to Armidale Airport in Armidale, New South Wales, Australia. The airport's former FAA identifier was 5R5.

Facilities and aircraft 
For the 12-month period ending July 28, 2005, the airport had 11,800 aircraft operations, an average of 32 per day: 99% general aviation and 1% military.

The airport is used by the South Texas Balloon Launch Team, an amateur radio balloon group based out of Houston, for free float balloon launches. The team launch BLT-27 on Saturday, August 20, 2019 at 10am.

References

External links 

Airports in Texas
Transportation in Wharton County, Texas
Buildings and structures in Wharton County, Texas